Viktor Scholz (born 10 February 1935) is a Russian-German church music director and concert organist.

Life 
Scholz was born Vitja Wladimirowitsch Kammeschow in the port city of Taganrog on the Sea of Azov and spent his childhood there. His father was a cellist and general music director of the city, his mother came from Moscow and was an aircraft designer by profession. During the Second World War, Taganrog was occupied by the Wehrmacht from 1941 to 1943. In 1945, his mother fled with him to Germany. The two reached Essen, where his mother became a housekeeper for the theologian Ernst Zenses. Scholz's father had been killed as a soldier in the war. Scholz was encouraged by Zenses and received his basic musical training from 1947 to 1954 in Essen with music director Heinz Gilhaus.

This was followed by studies at the Folkwang University of the Arts in Essen, which Scholz completed in 1959 with the Land music teacher's examination for the subjects piano and organ, with distinction in the organ subject.

Scholz took over as organist on sick leave at the Basilica of St. Vitus, Mönchengladbach at the end of 1957 and was subsequently employed there as cantor from 1 January 1958. He held the post for more than four decades, retiring in 2000. In addition, he worked as a lecturer for artistic organ playing and improvisation at the St. Gregorius House in Aachen. An extensive concert activity took him through Europe and Japan. In 1985/86, he was appointed church music director by diocesan bishop Klaus Hemmerle.

Scholz is married and lives with his wife in Mönchengladbach. The couple has three grown-up children, two of whom are also involved in music: Veit Scholz is solo bassoonist with the Düsseldorfer Symphoniker. Scholz is organ builder in Mönchengladbach.

Work 
Scholz distinguished himself by his unmistakable, almost preachy style of interpretation, which he enthusiastically passed on to his students and collaborators. Scholz made a special name for himself with his interpretations of The Way of the Cross and Symphony Passion by Marcel Dupré and the great organ works by Max Reger.

Recordings 
 Viktor Scholz spielt Werke von J. S. Bach u. K. Thieme. Pape, 1974
 Viktor Scholz spielt auf der Beckerath-Orgel, Hänssler Verlag, 1975
 Die Albiez-Orgel in der Mutterhauskirche zum Hl. Vinzenz. Psallite, 1976
 Viktor Scholz spielt Werke von Brahms, Fuchs und Schumann. Fono-Schallplattengesellschaft, 1979
 Die Oberlinger-Orgel in der Kath[olischen] Pfarrkirche S[ank]t Lambertus zu Erkelenz. Organophon, 1979
 Ars organi: Münster-Basilika zu Mönchengladbach. Aulos-Schallplatten-Produktion, Fono-Schallplattengesellschaft, 1980
 Die Orgel in der Basilika Steinfeld. Melos-Schallplattenverlag, Mönchengladbach, 1981
 Pastorale für Englischhorn und Orgel. Audite, Fono-Schallplattengesellschaft, 1996
 Habemus Papam. Das Vermächtnis des Karol Wojtyla. Musikado, 2003

References

External links 
 
 
 Portrait of Viktor Scholz on RP Online

German classical organists
1935 births
Living people
Musicians from Essen